Ton Zang Township is a township of Tedim District in the Chin State of Myanmar. The 3,471.24-square-kilometre Ton Zang township is bordered by Tedim (Tiddim) Township in the south, Kale Township of the Sagaing Division in the south-east, Tamu Township of the Sagaing Division in the north-east, the Indian state of Manipur in the north and the Indian state of Mizoram in the west.

Administrative divisions
The capital city of Ton Zang Township is Ton Zang town located in the Tuimang village.
Ton Zang Township is divided in 32 regions called villages:
 Anlun
 Balbil
 Bapi
 Darkhai (A)
 Gelmual
 Haicin
 Haipi
 Hangken
 Kampum
 Kansau
 Khuabem
 Lamthang
 Linhnuat
 Lungtak
 Mualpi
 Pangmual
 Phaitu
 Saipimual
 Salzang
 Sebawk
 Senam
 Singpial
 Sipek
 Suangpek
 Suangzang
 Thuitum (Capital Ton Zang)
 Tongcin
 Tuimang
 Tuimui
 Tungtuang
 Urban
 Zampi

Notes

External links
 "Tonzang Township, Chin State" map ID: MIMU249v1, created 6 August 2009, Myanmar Information Management Unit (MIMU)
 "Tonzang Google Satellite Map" Maplandia World Gazetteer

Townships of Chin State